These are the number-one albums in the United States per Billboard magazine during the year 1960. From May 5, 1959, until August 1963, separate charts existed for albums in mono and stereo formats. During 1960, those charts were named Mono Action Albums and Stereo Action Albums.

Chart history

References

See also
1960 in music

1960
United States Albums